The Ninth Ecumenical Council may refer to:
 The First Council of the Lateran of 1123
 The Fifth Council of Constantinople of 1341